Knud, Hereditary Prince of Denmark (Knud Christian Frederik Michael; 27 July 1900 – 14 June 1976) was a member of the Danish royal family, the younger son and child of King Christian X and Queen Alexandrine.

From 1947 to 1953, he was heir presumptive to his older brother, King Frederick IX, and would have succeeded him as king following his death in January 1972 had it not been for a change in the Danish Act of Succession that replaced him with his niece, Queen Margrethe II.

Early life and marriage

Prince Knud was born on 27 July 1900 at his parents' country residence, the Sorgenfri Palace, located on the shores of the small river Mølleåen in Kongens Lyngby north of Copenhagen on the island of Zealand in Denmark, during the reign of his great-grandfather King Christian IX. His parents were Prince Christian of Denmark, son of the heir apparent Crown Prince Frederick of Denmark, and Alexandrine of Mecklenburg-Schwerin. Knud's only sibling, Prince Frederick, had been born one year before him.

Christian IX died on 29 January 1906, and Knud's grandfather succeeded him as Frederick VIII. Six years later, on 14 May 1912, Frederick VIII died, and Knud's father ascended the throne as Christian X.

As was customary for princes at that time, Knud started a military education and entered the naval college. He married his first cousin, Princess Caroline-Mathilde of Denmark, on 8 September 1933 at Fredensborg Palace. She was a daughter of Frederick VIII's son Harald. Knud and Caroline-Mathilde had three children: Princess Elisabeth, Prince Ingolf and Prince Christian.

Heir presumptive
On 20 April 1947, Christian X died, and Knud's brother Frederick succeeded to the throne as Frederick IX. Since Frederick IX had fathered no sons and the Danish Act of Succession at the time followed the principle of agnatic primogeniture, Prince Knud became heir presumptive and next in line to succeed his brother as king. 

Frederick IX had, however, fathered three daughters. In 1953, the Danish Act of Succession was amended to follow the principle of male-preference primogeniture. The new law made Frederick IX's thirteen-year-old daughter Margrethe the new heir presumptive, placing her and her two sisters before Knud and his family in the line of succession.

Later life and legacy
King Frederick IX died in 1972 and was succeeded by his daughter Queen Margrethe II. Prince Knud died in Gentofte on 14 June 1976. He was buried at Roskilde Cathedral. His widow died on 12 December 1995.

In 1953 a students' home in Frederiksberg was named "Arveprins Knuds Kollegium" in honor of Prince Knud. At the time, Prince Knud was protector of Sydslesvigsk Studie- og Hjælpefond (Study and relief fund of Southern Schleswig),(see Danish minority of Southern Schleswig), an area that could be considered the birthplace of the House of Schleswig-Holstein-Sonderburg-Glücksburg, the royal family of which Knud was a part.

The Princess Caroline-Mathilde Alps in Greenland were named by the 1938–39 Mørkefjord Expedition in his wife's honour for Prince Knud had been the patron of the expedition.

The popular saying “En gang til for Prins Knud” (“One more time for Prince Knud”) is sometimes used when repeating or clarifying because the interlocutor is a bit slow-witted or didn't immediately grasp  something. The expression was first used in an article by Bent Thorndahl in the Copenhagen newspaper Politiken to describe the November 24, 1958 premiere, at the Falkoner Center in Frederiksberg, of the ballet “Det Forsinkede Stævnemøde” (“The postponed rendezvous”). Prince Knud and Princess Caroline Mathilde had sat in the former royal loge at the far left of the hall (i.e., stage right), but one especially memorable scene had not been fully visible from where they had sat. The ballet director, Ingvar Balduin Blicher-Hansen (1911–1995) persuaded the ballet ensemble to re-enact the scene for the royal couple. The following year, Birgitte Reimer, at the theatrical revue known as Cirkusrevyen, performed a song, written by Erik Leth to a tune by Sven Gyldmark, which immortalized Prince Knud, somewhat unfairly mocking him as supposedly being a dullard: “Så ta'r vi den en gang til for Prins Knud.” (“Now we'll do it one more time for Prince Knud.”)

Issue
Princess Elisabeth Caroline-Mathilde Alexandrine Helena Olga Thyra Feodora Estrid Margarethe Désirée (8 May 1935 – 19 June 2018)
Prince Ingolf Christian Frederik Knud Harald Gorm Gustav Viggo Valdemar Aage of Denmark (born 17 February 1940). Lost his title and became Count Ingolf of Rosenborg after marrying without royal consent to Inge Terney. He has no issue.
Prince Christian Frederik Franz Knud Harald Carl Oluf Gustav Georg Erik of Denmark (22 October 1942 – 22 May 2013). Lost his title and became Count Christian of Rosenborg after marrying without consent to Anne Dorte Maltoft-Nielsen. He had three daughters, Countess Josephine, Countess Camilla, and Countess Feodora.

Honours
Danish and Icelandic honours
 Knight of the Order of the Elephant, 14 May 1912
 Cross of Honour of the Order of the Dannebrog, 27 July 1918
 Grand Commander of the Order of the Dannebrog, 15 May 1937
 Grand Cross of the Order of the Falcon
 King Christian IX Centenary Medal
 King Frederik VIII Centenary Medal
 Navy Long Service Award

Foreign honours
 : Grand Cordon of the Order of Leopold
 : Grand Cross of the Order of the Southern Cross
 : Grand Cross of the Order of the Star of Ethiopia
 : Grand Cross of the Order of the White Rose of Finland
 : Grand Cross of the Legion of Honour
  Greek Royal Family:
 Grand Cross of the Order of the Redeemer
 Grand Cross of the Order of Saints George and Constantine
  Italian Royal Family: Knight of the Supreme Order of the Most Holy Annunciation
 : Grand Cordon of the Order of the Rising Sun, with Pawlownia Flowers
  Mecklenburg Grand Ducal Family: Grand Cross of the House Order of the Wendish Crown, with Crown in Ore
 : Grand Cross of the Order of Saint-Charles, 5 March 1936
 : Grand Cross of the Order of the Netherlands Lion
 : Grand Cross of the Royal Norwegian Order of St. Olav, with Collar, 31 October 1924
 : Grand Cross of the Order of Naval Merit
 : Knight of the Royal Order of the Seraphim, 26 September 1926
 : Knight of the Order of the Royal House of Chakri, 13 February 1929

Ancestors

References

Citations

Bibliography

External links

 Prince Knud at the website of the Royal Danish Collection at Amalienborg Palace

Danish princes
1900 births
1976 deaths
House of Glücksburg (Denmark)
People from Lyngby-Taarbæk Municipality
Burials at Roskilde Cathedral

Grand Commanders of the Order of the Dannebrog
Recipients of the Cross of Honour of the Order of the Dannebrog
Knights Grand Cross of the Order of the Falcon
Grand Crosses of the Order of Saints George and Constantine
Recipients of the Order of the Netherlands Lion
Grand Crosses of the Order of Saint-Charles
Grand Crosses of Naval Merit
Grand Croix of the Légion d'honneur
Sons of kings
Non-inheriting heirs presumptive
Recipients of orders, decorations, and medals of Ethiopia